Muhamed Šefket Kurt (1879 – 21 June 1963) was a Bosnian Imam, theologian and the Mufti of the cities of Banja Luka and Tuzla. He is credited with saving the lives of hundreds of Serbs during World War II.

Early life
Muhamed Šefket Kurt was born in Travnik, Bosnia and Herzegovina, then a part the Austro-Hungarian Empire in 1879 to ethnic Bosniak parents.

Kurt finished the mekteb and began studying in the madrasa in front of his father Fadil (1845–1893). When his father, died 14 year old Muhamed went from Travnik to Mostar to his paternal grandfather Ahmet Kurt, an Islamic theologian, where he finished his education and listened to lectures by the famous Mostar scholar Fehim Džabić, mufti and fighter for the religious autonomy of Bosnian Muslims. In 1895, after the death of his grandfather Ahmet, he went to Sarajevo and enrolled in the Kursumlija Madrasa, from which he went to study in Istanbul a year later. He studied there for a full ten years and went to Damascus for the purpose of learning the Arabic language. Upon his return to Bosnia and Herzegovina in 1908, he was appointed imam and hatib of Hajji Ali-beg's mosque and muderis of his madrasa in Travnik.

Mufti
He lived with his family in Travnik until 1914 when he moved to Banja Luka in 1914, where he was appointed mufti. He arrived in Tuzla in 1925 and remained mufti until 1933, when he was elected a member of the Ulema Majlis in Sarajevo. He retired in 1936.

World War II
At the beginning of World War II in April 1941, 108 of the most prominent Sarajevo Bosniaks adopted a resolution stating the difficult situation and persecution of the Serb population and demanding that it be stopped. Similar resolutions were passed in Banja Luka, Prijedor and Bijeljina. In Mostar, such a resolution was won on 21 October 1941. On 11 December 1941, the Tuzla Resolution was passed. Her original text was written in an extremely sharp tone, so it was decided not to send the text, but to send a delegation of eleven Bosniaks and three Croats to Z
Zagreb and to verbally protest in the government of the Axis-aligned Independent State of Croatia over the crime. The resolutions themselves did not achieve much success, and persecutions, killings and torture continued.

On Orthodox Christmas Eve, 6 January 1942, Ustasha authorities in occupied Tuzla intended to demolish the Cathedral of the Assumption of the Most Holy Mother of God. Along with the demolition of the Tuzla Orthodox Church, the Ustashas intended to carry out a mass execution of Serb civilians on Christmas Eve.

Personal life
Kurt married Arifa (''née' Turalić; 1883–1959) from Tešanj and they had eight children together. Two of their sons were killed while fighting with the Yugoslav Partisans in the Second World War and a third son was killed by the Partisans near the end of the war out of unknown reasons. A fourth son was declared an "enemy of the people]" by the new communist government of the Yugoslavia and imprisoned for 20 years.

References

1963 deaths
1879 births
Bosnia and Herzegovina theologians
19th-century Bosnia and Herzegovina people
19th-century imams
20th-century imams
Bosnia and Herzegovina imams